In toxicodynamics and pharmacodynamics, Loewe additivity (or dose additivity) is one of several common reference models used for measuring the effects of drug combinations.

Definition 
Let   and   be doses of compounds 1 and 2 producing in combination an effect .
 quantifies the potency of compound 1  relatively to that of compound 2. 

 can be interpreted as the dose  of compound 2 converted into the corresponding dose of compound 1 after accounting for difference in potency. 

Loewe additivity is defined as the situation where  or 
.

Testing

The Loewe additivity equation provides a prediction of the dose combination eliciting a given effect. Departure from Loewe additivity can be assessed informally by comparing this prediction to observations. This approach is known in toxicology as the model deviation ratio (MDR).

This approach can be rooted in a more formal statistical method with the derivation of approximate p-values with Monte Carlo simulation, as implemented in the R package MDR.

References 

Clinical pharmacology